Põhimaantee 11 (ofcl. abbr. T11; Tallinn ring road) is a semi-orbital highway around the city of Tallinn. The road is part of the European route E265. The highway starts in Nehatu, Tallinn. From there the main cities passed are Jüri, Saku and Saue. The highway ends in Keila, when intersecting with the T8.

The road serves a connection between Tallinn's metropolitan area and the numerous national routes that intersect it. In 2020, the highest traffic volumes were between Nehatu and Luige, with an AADT of 17,000. The rest of the route had an AADT of around 12,000.

The road is a dual carriageway (I class highway) The section is between Nehatu and Saue (29 kilometres) where the rest of the route is a standard 1+1 road till Keila.

Route
The T11 (Estonian: põhimaantee 11; Tallinna ringtee) is a semi-orbital highway around Tallinn, connecting its metropolitan region to numerous national main routes. The road also serves as a compulsory truck traffic route (as in Nõmme, the T4 is banned for truck traffic). The T11 is a part of the European route E265.

The highway begins in Nehatu from the intersection with the T1 and Rahu tee. The road then starts to orbit Tallinn, heading southwest. At Jüri, the road intersects with the T2 at a roundabout interchange and turns west. The road intersects with the T115 at Kurna and with T15 at Luige. At Saue, the road intersects with the T4 on a cloverleaf. After Saue the road continues westbound and terminates at a roundabout with the T8 outside Keila.

Currently there are no speed cameras on the T11.

Road length of lane

See also

References

N11